Sønder Aarslev Church (Danish: Sønder Aarslev Kirke) is a church located in Årslev, a small village-suburb in the western parts of Aarhus, Denmark. Årslev is situated in the Brabrand district, west of Aarhus city center. It is the church of Sønder Årslev Parish within the Church of Denmark and serves a parish population of 993 (2016). The church has an adjoining cemetery and the painter Jens Hansen-Aarslev (1847–1928) is buried there.

History 
Sønder Aarslev Church originally belonged to the Ancient See of Aarhus but after the reformation ownership passed to the Danish Crown. In 1686 the owner of Kærbygård Manor Otto Bielke was given Sønder Aarslev Church by king Christian V but five years later he sold it to the merchant Christen Wegerslev in Aarhus. In the following the church changed owner several times before Count Christian Frijs of Frijsenborg Manor bought the church on auction in 1758. In 1912 the church became self-owning in connection with the abolition of tithe.

Until 12 May 1873, Tilst Church functioned as an annex to Sønder Aarslev Church in Sønder Aarslev Parish. In 1873, Sønder Aarslev Church itself became an annex church to Brabrand Church, while Tilst Church became the primary church in its own pastorate where Kasted Church was an annex.

Architecture 
The oldest parts of the church building was likely constructed in the end of the 1100s when a stone church replaced an original wooden structure. In the late Middle Ages the church was expanded and the original flat wooden ceiling was replaced with Gothic rib vaults. The first tower, a Stilt Tower, is likely from this period as well. In 1883 the church got its present tower. In 1870 the church was extensively renovated and crow-stepped gables were added and the north door was walled off.

See also 
 List of Churches in Aarhus

References

External links

Kolt Church Website
Church of Denmark's page for Kolt Parish

Lutheran churches in Aarhus
Lutheran churches converted from Roman Catholicism
Churches in the Diocese of Aarhus